Blackrock Ridge is a ridge of exposed dark rock trending west-southwest–east-northeast, located  north of Penguin Point in central Seymour Island. The descriptive name "Filo Negro" (black ridge) was applied to this feature in Argentine geological reports on the island in 1978. The approved name, jointly recommended by the Advisory Committee on Antarctic Names and the UK Antarctic Place-Names Committee in 1991, avoids duplication with Black Ridge in the Deep Freeze Range.

References 

Ridges of Graham Land
Landforms of the James Ross Island group